The Football Federation Tasmania 2016 season was the fourth season under the new competition format in Tasmania. The competition consisted of three major divisions across the State of Tasmania, created from the teams in the previous structure. The overall premier for the new structure qualified for the National Premier Leagues finals series, competing with the other state federation champions in a final knock-out tournament to decide the National Premier Leagues Champion for 2016.

Men's Competitions

2016 NPL Tasmania

The 2016 NPL Tasmania season was played as a triple round-robin over 21 rounds.

League Cup
The end of season finals series for the League Cup was held using the same format as the previous year, which included the top six teams from the NPL Tasmania as well as the premiers from the Northern Championship (Somerset) and Southern Championship (Glenorchy Knights). The quarter-final and semi-final matches were decided by random draw. The competition was formerly known as the Victory Cup, but was renamed due to lapsing sponsorship arrangements.

2016 Tasmanian Championships

2016 Northern Championship

The 2016 Northern Championship was the third edition of the Northern Championship as the second level domestic association football competition in Tasmania (third level overall in Australia). The league was played as a triple round-robin over 21 rounds. The highest placed team - other than those that also play in the NPL - qualified for the League Cup finals series.

2016 Southern Championship

The 2016 Southern Championship was the third edition of the Southern Championship as the second level domestic association football competition in Tasmania (third level overall in Australia). The league was played as a double round-robin over 16 rounds. The highest placed team - other than those that also play in the NPL - qualified for the League Cup finals series.

2016 Tasmanian Championship One

2016 Northern Championship One

The 2016 Northern Championship One was the third edition of the Northern Championship One as the third level domestic association football competition in Tasmania (fourth level overall in Australia). The league was played as a triple round-robin over 21 rounds.

2016 Southern Championship One

The 2016 Southern Championship One was the third edition of the Southern Championship One as the third level domestic association football competition in Tasmania (fourth level overall in Australia). The league was played as a double round-robin over 18 rounds.

2016 Tasmanian League Two

2016 Northern League Two

The 2016 Northern League Two was the third edition of the Northern League Two as the Fourth level domestic association football competition in Tasmania (fifth level overall in Australia). The league was played as a quintuple round-robin over 20 rounds.

Women's Competitions

2016 Women's Super League

The 2016 Women's Super League season was the first edition of a statewide Tasmanian women's association football league. The league was played as a double round-robin over 14 rounds.

Cup Competitions

The Milan Lakoseljac Cup competition also served as the Tasmanian Preliminary Rounds for the 2016 FFA Cup. Devonport City entered at the Round of 32, and were eliminated in the Round of 16.

References

Football Federation Tasmania
Football Federation Tasmania seasons